Otomitla is an extinct genus of prehistoric ray-finned fish that lived during the Early Cretaceous epoch.

See also

 Prehistoric fish
 List of prehistoric bony fish

References

Early Cretaceous fish
Fossils of Mexico
Prehistoric ray-finned fish genera